is an upcoming professional wrestling event promoted by World Wonder Ring Stardom. The event will take place on March 25, 2023, in Yokohama, Japan at the Yokohama Budokan. The event will see the finals of the New Blood Tag Team Championship tournament to crown the inaugural New Blood Tag Team Champions.

Background
The "New Blood" is a series of events that mainly focus on matches where rookie wrestlers, usually with three or fewer years of in-ring experience, evolve. Besides wrestlers from Stardom, various superstars from multiple promotions of the Japanese independent scene are invited to compete in bouts that are usually going under the stipulation of singles or tag team matches.

The show features professional wrestling matches that result from scripted storylines, where wrestlers portray villains, heroes, or less distinguishable characters in the scripted events that build tension and culminates in a wrestling match or series of matches. 
During the Stardom New Blood 6 event, it was announced that New Blood Tag Team Championship would be introduced, with a tournament to crown the inaugural champions beginning at New Blood 7 on January 20, and concluding at New Blood Premium in Yokohama Budokan on March 25.

On the twelvth night of the Triangle Derby I from February 17, 2023, Stardom announced Hanako Ueda, Sakura Ishiguro and Komomo Minami as their newest trainees and they were all set to make their debuts at New Blood Premium on March 25, 2023. At the event's press conference from March 7, their respective matches were announced alongside their new ring names. Ishiguro and Ueda would go under the names of Sakura Aya and Hanako, while Minami kept her original name.

Matches

New Blood Tag Team Championship Inaugural Tournament

Notes

References

External links
Page Stardom World

2023 in professional wrestling
World Wonder Ring Stardom shows
Women's professional wrestling shows
World Wonder Ring Stardom
Events in Yokohama
Professional wrestling in Yokohama